Djibouti, officially the Republic of Djibouti, is a country located in the Horn of Africa. Djibouti's economy is largely concentrated in the service sector. Commercial activities revolve around the country's free trade policies and strategic location as a Red Sea transit point. Due to limited rainfall, vegetables and fruits serve as the principal production crops, and other food items require importation. The gross domestic product in 2012 was estimated at $2.377 billion, with a real growth rate of 4.8% annually. Per capita income was around $2,700.

Notable firms 
This list includes notable companies with primary headquarters located in the country. The industry and sector follow the Industry Classification Benchmark taxonomy. Organizations which have ceased operations are included and noted as defunct.

See also 
 Economy of Djibouti
 List of airlines of Djibouti
 List of banks in Djibouti

References 

Companies of Djibouti
Economy of Djibouti
 
Djibouti